Where's My Jetpack: A Guide to the Amazing Science Fiction Future that Never Arrived is a semi-satirical non-fiction book by Daniel Wilson published in April 2007.

2007 non-fiction books
American non-fiction books
Futurology books